Glauber or Gláuber may refer to:

 Glauber, a computer software system
 Glauber (crater)
 Gláuber (footballer, born 1983) (Gláuber Leandro Honorato Berti), Brazilian football centre back
 Gláuber (footballer, born 1981) (Gláuber Vian Corrêa), Brazilian football defender
 Gláuber (footballer, born 2000) (Gláuber Siqueira dos Santos Lima), Brazilian football defender
 Roy J. Glauber (1925–2018), American physicist
 Johann Rudolf Glauber, Dutch-German alchemist and chemist
 Lucky Glauber, fictional video game character
 Glauber Rocha, Brazilian filmmaker
 Glauber (footballer, born 1983) (Glauber Rodrigues da Silva)
 Glauber (footballer, born 1996), Brazilian footballer